Thorpe Marsh Power Station was a 1 GW coal-fired power station near Barnby Dun in South Yorkshire, England. The station was commissioned in 1963 and closed in 1994. In 2011, permission was given for the construction of a gas-fired power station on the site.

History

Construction and operation, (1959–1994)
Construction of the station began in 1959; it was built as a prototype for all the large modern power stations in the UK. It was commissioned between 1963 and 1965. Thorpe Marsh was one of the CEGB’s twenty steam power stations with the highest thermal efficiency; in 1963–4 the thermal efficiency was 31.50 per cent, 32.76 per cent in 1964–5, and 33.09 per cent in 1965–6.

There were 2 × 28 MW auxiliary gas turbines on the site, these had been commissioned in December 1966.

The plant was officially opened in 1967.

The station contained two 550 MW generating units with cross compound turbines, supplied from a single boiler.

The annual electricity output of Thorpe Marsh was:

On 7 January 1973, four workmen died. A coroner's report gave a verdict of accidental death; subsequently the Factory Inspectorate began legal proceedings against the Central Electricity Generating Board (CEGB) for breaches in safety provisions.

After the privatisation of the CEGB in 1990, the station was operated by National Power. The station subsequently closed in 1994.

Post closure (1994–)
The  site was acquired by Able UK in 1995.

During the 2007 United Kingdom floods, the 400 kV substation at the site was temporarily shut down on 27 June, whilst the 275 kV substation was not affected; operational service was fully restored by early 28 June.

In October 2011, the Department of Energy and Climate Change approved the construction of a 1,500 MW combined cycle gas turbine power station at Thorpe Marsh by Thorpe Marsh Power Limited (parent Acorn Power Developments, see Acorn Energy) with an estimated cost of £984 million. Thorpe Marsh Power Limited proposed an initial capacity of 960 MW. The proposed development would also require the construction of an  gas pipeline from Camblesforth; Thorpe Marsh Power Limited is expected to submit an application for the gas pipeline in late 2014.

Able UK demolished the original power station's cooling towers in 2012.

References

Further reading

External links

 
 
  Images of derelict power station .

Coal-fired power stations in England
Buildings and structures in Doncaster
Power stations in Yorkshire and the Humber
Former power stations in England